The 1970 All-Southwest Conference football team consists of American football players chosen by various organizations for All-Southwest Conference teams for the 1970 NCAA University Division football season.  The selectors for the 1970 season included the Associated Press (AP) and the United Press (UP).  Players selected as first-team players by both the AP and UP are designated in bold.

All Southwest selections

Offense

Split ends
 Chuck Dicus, Arkansas (AP-1)

Flankers
 Derek Davis, Baylor (AP-1)

Tackles
 Bobby Wuensch, Texas (AP-1)
 Bill Jackson, SMU (AP-1)

Guards
 Ronnie Hammers, Arkansas (AP-1)
 Bobby Mitchell, Texas (AP-1)

Tight ends
 Pat Morrison, Arkansas (AP-1)

Centers
 John Ruthstrom, Texas Christian (AP-1)

Quarterbacks
 Bill Montgomery, Arkansas (AP-1)

Fullbacks
 Steve Worster, Texas (AP-1)

Tailbacks
 Bill Burnett, Arkansas (AP-1)

Defense

Defensive ends
 Bill Atessis, Texas (AP-1)
 Bruce Dowdy, Texas Tech (AP-1)

Defensive tackles
 Dick Bumpas, Arkansas (AP-1)
 Wayne McDermand, Texas Tech (AP-1)

Middle guards
 Roger Roitsch, Rice (AP-1)

Linebackers
 Scott Henderson, Texas (AP-1)
 Mike Boschetti, Arkansas (AP-1)
 David Jones, Baylor (AP-1)

Defensive backs
 Bucky Allhouse, Rice (AP-1)
 Ken Perkins, Texas Tech (AP-1)
 Dave Elmendorf, Texas A&M (AP-1)
 Jerry Moore, Arkansas (AP-1)

Key
AP = Associated Press

See also
1970 College Football All-America Team

References

All-Southwest Conference
All-Southwest Conference football teams